The Cabinet of Emil Jónsson in Iceland was formed 23 December 1958 and dissolved 20 November 1959.

Cabinets

Inaugural cabinet: 23 December 1958 – 20 November 1959

See also
Government of Iceland
Cabinet of Iceland

References

Emil Jonsson, Cabinet of
Emil Jonsson, Cabinet of
Emil Jonsson, Cabinet of
Cabinets established in 1958
Cabinets disestablished in 1959